Satyajit Chatterjee is an Indian former footballer and coach, who captained Mohun Bagan and represented India internationally. He is currently the assistant general secretary of Mohun Bagan AC.

He was born in Bally in the Howrah district of West Bengal.

Career

Playing career
Chatterjee appeared with Calcutta Football League club George Telegraph, before signing with Mohun Bagan. He played for Mohun Bagan for fifteen consecutive years from 1986 to 2000, and captained the team in 1990. With "the mariners", he played alongside players like Krishanu Dey and Chima Okorie.

He has also represented India internationally.

Coaching career
The holder of an AFC "C" coaching licence holder, Chatterjee has worked as an assistant coach to Carlos Pereira, Karim Bencherifa and Amal Dutta.

After coaching Mohun Bagan for a friendly against Bayern Munich, a testimonial match for Oliver Kahn held in Salt Lake Stadium, he had a short stint as the club's head coach in 2009–10 season, before resigning from the job taking the responsibility for the club's poor performance.

Administrative career
In 2015, Chatterjee fought for the post of football secretary in Mohun Bagan club election and defeated Subrata Bhattacharya with more than 2000 votes.

Honours 

Mohun Bagan
National Football League: 1997–98, 1999–2000.
Federation Cup: 1986, 1987, 1992, 1993, 1994, 1998.
Calcutta Football League: 1986, 1990, 1992, 1994, 1997.
IFA Shield: 1987, 1989, 1998, 1999.
Durand Cup: 1986, 1994, 2000.
Rovers Cup: 1988, 1991, 1992, 2000.
Sikkim Governor's Gold Cup: 1986, 1989, 1991, 1992, 1994, 2000.
Bordoloi Trophy: 1996.
All Airlines Gold Cup: 1989, 1991, 1993, 2000.
McDowell's Cup: 1996, 1999
DCM Trophy: 1997

India
 South Asian Games Gold medal: 1987; Bronze medal: 1989

Individual
 Mohun Bagan Ratna Award: 2001

References

External links 
  mohunbaganac.com
 Stats at RSSSF

Indian footballers
Living people
Footballers from West Bengal
Year of birth missing (living people)
People from Howrah
Indian football coaches
Indian football managers
Association football midfielders
Mohun Bagan AC managers
South Asian Games medalists in football
South Asian Games gold medalists for India
South Asian Games bronze medalists for India